Rogério Dutra da Silva won the first edition of the tournament against Peter Polansky 6–3, 6–0 in the final.

Seeds

Draw

Finals

Top half

Bottom half

References
 Main Draw
 Qualifying Draw

Visit Panama Cup - Singles
2012 Singles